Büsser is a surname. Notable people with name include:

 Maximilian Büsser, Swiss businessman and founder of watch brand Maximilian Büsser and Friends
 Henri Büsser (1872–1973), French classical composer, organist, and conductor
 Carlos Büsser (1928–2012), Argentine naval officer 
 Josef Büsser (1896–1952), Swiss painter, sculptor and art teacher
 Karl Büsser, Swiss sidecarcross passenger
 Eduard Büsser (1899–1949), Swiss painter
 Jari De Busser (born 1999), Belgian professional footballer